Ilorin is the capital city of Kwara State in Western Nigeria. As of the 2006 census, it had a population of 777,667, making it the 7th largest city by population in Nigeria.

History

Ilorin was founded by the Yoruba, one of the three largest ethnic groups in Nigeria, in 1450. It became a provincial military headquarters of the ancient Oyo Empire, and later became a Northern Nigeria protectorate when Shehu Alimi, an itinerant Islamic preacher and teacher, took control of the city through the spread of Islam. The capital was occupied by the Royal Niger Company in 1897 and its lands were incorporated into the British colony of Northern Nigeria in 1900, although the emirate continued to perform ceremonial functions. The city retains a strong Islamic influence, although Christianity is now widely practised in the cosmopolitan part of the city due to the significant immigration of people from other parts of Kwara State and the rest of Nigeria.

Sports

Ilorin has an 18,000-capacity stadium and two professional football teams; Kwara United F.C. playing in the top-tier league of Nigeria Professional Football League (N.P.F.L) which is run by the League Management Company; and ABS F.C. in the second division which is Bet9ja Nigeria National league.

The city has the only standard baseball field in West Africa. It has also hosted several national handball competitions.

Commerce

The political economy of Kwara State can be traced to 1967 when it was created. Since then the state has undergone various developmental efforts, mostly initiated by the federal government given the nature of the Nigerian state, a centralized federal system where development policies and programmes originate from the centre.

The state has a large area of rich agricultural land. The limestone and dolomite of Oreke, kaolin and clay at Idofian near Ilorin and other parts of the state, pure gold in Kaiama and the Patigi area, and the highly exportable rich tantalite deposit of Iporin make Kwara State rich in primary resources.

Initially, Kwara State had only a few major industrial companies, Global Soap (not more in operation), Detergent Industries Nigeria Limited and the International Tobacco Company. Successive administrations have attempted to attract industrialists to the state.

With such efforts, Ilorin has become the hub for cashew processing in Nigeria and Olam International has set up Africa's biggest cashew processing plant. The plant processes 100 MT of cashews every day and provides employment to over 2000 workers.

Recently established industries include Dangote Flour Mills, Tuyil Pharmaceutical company, KAMWIL, Golden Confectionate Food Industries, Chellaram Motor-Cycle Assembly plants, and Rajrab Pharmaceuticals.

Climate
Ilorin has a tropical savanna climate (Köppen climate classification Aw).

Transport

Ilorin operates a relatively well-developed intra-city public transportation, and the major roads within the metropolis are good.

There are three different modes of transiting from one place to another in the city – the most popular being the conventional taxis. Car-hire services are also available in major hotels. Furthermore, there are commercial motorbikes, commonly called "Okada", and the more recent arrival on Ilorin's roads of commercial tricycles, popularly called "Keke NAPEP" or "Keke" or "Keke Maruwa", some of which are given on loan to beneficiaries of the National Poverty Eradication Programme. Ilorin taxis are painted yellow and green.

Ilorin's central location makes it easily accessible to all parts of the country by air, road and rail. The state has a good network of roads, rail and air transportation facilities linking it with Nigeria's other industrial and commercial centres. Transportation is quite affordable in Ilorin with movement from one place to another for as low as fifty naira.

There are scheduled daily commercial flights to and from Ilorin International Airport by Arik Air and Overland Airways. The now defunct Capital Airlines also operated from Ilorin. Current destinations include all of the major cities in Nigeria. The airport has also been re-designed and equipped as an international cargo airport.

Ilorin offers reliable road transport services to Lagos, Ogun, Osun, Ondo, Oyo, Ekiti, Kogi, Niger, Kaduna and Plateau States. Similar services are available to and from Onitsha, Port Harcourt, Abuja, Aba and others.

A major expressway to Ibadan, numbered E1, is currently under construction by P.W. International.

Culture

Religion
The city is a confluence of cultures, populated by the Yoruba, Fulani, Nupe, Bariba, Kanuri, Igbo and Hausa ethnicities from across Nigeria, as well as foreign and nationals. There are large Christian and Islamic populations, and many ceremonial activities, mostly with religious aspects, take place in the city throughout the year.

Ilorin has a friendly environment (generally called the "Home of Peace"), and hence host different religious practices and training institute, such as the degree-awarding United Missionary Theological College (affiliated with the University of Ibadan and University of Ilorin) produces many church ministers, teachers and theologians of all denominations. The College of Arabic and Islamic Legal Studies in the Adeta area trains Muslims in various Islamic, Arabic and social science disciplines.

Christianity in Ilorin

The city has a host of ancient and modern churches with moderate to large congregations, such as the holy order of Cherubim and Seraphim churches, Anglican, Methodist, Celestial Church of Christ, The Holy Trinity Gospel Church International, Evangelical Church Winning All (ECWA), United Missionary Church of Africa (UMCA), Catholic Church, Emmanuel Baptist Church, First Baptist Church, Zion Baptist church. Notable Pentecostal churches which include Redeemed Christian Church of God, The Gospel Faith Mission International (Gofamint), Deeper Life Church, Living Faith Church(winners chapel), Common Wealth of Zion Assembly, Seventh-day Adventist and Protestant populations of the Christian faith. Most Christian churches in the state started schools and introduced innovative ideas that were readily adopted by the Muslim schools.

There has been a Latter-day Saint congregation in Ilorin since 1992. In that year an LDS mission was organized in the city that year, but shortly later merged with the one in Enugu. Starting in 2016 additional LDS congregations were organized in Ilorin, which in 2018 was transferred to the new Nigerian Ibadan Mission, and had a district organized.

Ilorin Central Mosque

History
The first Ilorin central mosque was founded in 1820 in the Agbarere Area, popularly known as "Ile-Elewa", under the leadership of Sheik Imam Muhammad Munab'bau. This was followed in 1835 when another central mosque was built at Idi-Ape during the reign of the first Emir of Ilorin, Abdus-salam. However, more than a century later, this central mosque could no longer cope with the growth in the Muslim population of the city. For this reason, in 1974, the ninth Emir of Ilorin, Alhaji (Dr) Zulkarnaini Gambari, invited Grand Mufti Alhaji Mohammed Kamal-u-deen and the then present Wazirin Ngeri of Ilorin, Dr. Abubakar Sola Saraki, to co-ordinate the fundraising and construction of a new central mosque.

The present Ilorin Central Mosque

On 30 April 1977, the foundation was laid for the new mosque by the Emir of Gwandu on behalf of the Sarki Musulmi, Sultan Abubakar III. The new Ilorin Central Mosque was completed and officially opened in 1981 by the former president Alhaji Shehu Shagari. The Mosque was renovated, rehabilitated and expanded in 2012 with a majestic view. The newly redecorated mosque was recommissioned on 14 December 2012.

The "New" Ilorin Central Mosque
Planning for the rehabilitation, refurbishment and redecoration of the Central Mosque started in 2007 when Alhaji (Dr) Ibrahim Zulu Gambari, CFR, the eleventh Emir of Ilorin, with assistance from Dr. Abubakar Bukola Saraki, the Turaki of Ilorin, and the former Governor of Kwara State, set up a technical committee headed by Alhaji Shehu Abdul-gafar on the rehabilitation and enhancement of the central mosque. The committee has invited expertise from specialists in mosque construction from around the world, especially from Saudi Arabia, the United Arab Emirates and Nigeria.

In addition to the general restoration and enhancement of the mosque, it now has a total of 99 domes of different diameters, 75 feet above the floor. The large dome is made of gold finish while the four big domes around are coated in green with reflective illumination. The mosque form is enveloped within a pyramid shape with a square base and 45 inclinations for the faces. It has four accessible minarets, each standing at a height of 150 feet. Moreover, all the dilapidated domes and minarets with mosaic finishing were restored and finished with cut-to-size marble. The exterior and interior are covered by special marble while the expanded courtyard was constructed with heat-absorbing granite (marble) finish. The doors and windows were replaced with specially designed ones befitting the new mosque concept.

Arts and Tourism

The city also has a range of tourist attractions such as the Sobi Hill which is said to have offered protection to natives during intertribal wars in ancient times.

The Okuta Ilorin is located in Asaju's compound, Idi-Ape Quarters. It is the stone on which Ojo Isekuse, one of the founders of the city, used to sharpen his metal tools. 

It was actually called "Okuta ilo irin" (meaning stone for sharpening metals). It is from this tool, the town Ilorin derived its name. 
The stone was a deified object of worship and sacrifice offerings in the past.

Pottery is a big business in Ilorin. 

The city has the biggest traditional pottery workshops in Nigeria. They are located in the Dada area of Okelele, Eletu in Oju-Ekun, Okekura, Oloje, Abe Emi and Ita Merin.

The traditional textile industry also thrives in Ilorin. In various parts of the city, aso-oke, textiles hand-woven on simple looms, are made in large quantities. 

Aso-oke is purchased by traders and fashion designers from Kwara State, other parts of Nigeria and abroad.

The cultural center houses the Kwara State Council for Arts and Culture, its performing troupe, and a gallery with artworks and antiquities. Souvenirs of cultural and historical values are also available.

Metropolitan Park, a recreational park, is located on Unity Road. The Kwara State Stadium Complex has an Olympic-sized swimming pool with facilities for diving.

A purpose-built baseball park is located in the Adewole area of the city.

The Esie Museum is of major importance to the Nigeria's many cultures.

Education

Ilorin is home to more than two universities, the University of Ilorin and Al-Hikmah University, Ilorin; it also has Kwara State University within its metropolitan area.

It is also home to the following educational institutions:
International Aviation College, Ilorin.
Emmanuel Baptist College
Kwara State College of Arabic and Islamic Legal Studies, Ilorin
Kwara State College of Education, Ilorin
Kwara State Polytechnic
Unilorin Secondary School

Agriculture and Rural Management Training Institute
Muhyideen College of Education
Ansarul Islam Secondary School, Ilorin
Army Day Secondary School, Sobi Barrack, Ilorin
Baboko Community Secondary School, Ilorin
Bishop Smith Memorial College
Cherubim and Seraphim College, Ilorin
Federal Government College, Ilorin
Federal Training Center, Ilorin
Government Day Secondary School, Karuma, Ilorin
Government Girls Day Secondary School, Ilorin
Government Secondary School, Adeta, Ilorin
Government Secondary School, Ilorin Founded in 1914
Ilorin Grammar School, Ilorin
IQRA College, Ilorin
Michael Imoudu Institute for Labour Studies
Mount Carmel College, Ilorin
National Centre for Agricultural Mechanization
Saint Anthony's Secondary School, Ilorin
School of Nursing and Midwifery, Ilorin
Socrates College, Ilorin
U.M.C.A High school, Ilorin
United Missionary Theological Seminary

See also

 Ilorin Emirate

References

 
State capitals in Nigeria
Cities in Yorubaland
Cities in Nigeria
Populated places in Kwara State
1450 establishments